EGB may refer to:

 Educación General Básica, the first phase of Education in Spain
 EGB Forces, a special operations force of the German Bundeswehr
 Erzgebirgsbahn, a German railway
 European Green Belt